Gnaeus Afranius Dexter (died June 24, AD 105) was a Roman Senator who was murdered by one of his slaves. He was a suffect consul as the colleague of Gaius Julius Quadratus Bassus at the time of his death. Paul von Rohden suggests he may be the same Dexter Martial mentions as a hunter in two of his epigrams (vii.27.3; xi.69.3).

Due to Roman law, if a slave owner is murdered in his home, his slaves could be executed and his freedmen relegated, based on the presumption that they should have come to his defense. Pliny the Younger participated in the Senatorial trial of Dexter's slaves and freedmen, fighting to have them acquitted.

References 

1st-century births

105 deaths
Year of birth unknown

Senators of the Roman Empire
Suffect consuls of Imperial Rome
Ancient Roman murder victims
Roman consuls who died in office
Dexter, Gnaeus
Slavery in ancient Rome
1st-century Romans
2nd-century Romans